Watsonarctia is a monotypic moth genus in the subfamily Arctiinae erected by Josef J. de Freina and Thomas Joseph Witt in 1984. Its only species, Watsonarctia deserta, the chaste pellicle, was first described by Max Bartel in 1902. It is found in central and south-eastern Europe, southern Russia, southern Siberia east to Lake Baikal; also in Asia Minor, Armenia, Azerbaijan, northern Iran, Kazakhstan, Kyrghyzstan and Xinjiang in China.

The wingspan is 26–32 mm.

The larvae feed on Asperula, Achillea and Galium species (including Galium verum and Galium odoratum).

Subspecies
Watsonarctia deserta deserta (Bartel, 1902) (southern and central Europe, Caucasus, north-western Kazakhstan, southern Siberia, northern Mongolia)
Watsonarctia deserta karduchena (de Freina, 1983) (Anatolia)
Watsonarctia deserta centralasiae (O. Bang-Haas, 1927) (mountains of eastern Kazakhstan, Xinjiang, eastern Tien Shan)
Watsonarctia deserta elbursica Dubatolov & Zahiri, 2005 (northern Iran)

References

External links

Fauna Europaea
Lepiforum e.V.

Spilosomina
Moths of Asia
Moths of Europe
Moths of the Middle East
Insects of Central Asia
Biota of Xinjiang
Insects of Iran
Taxa named by Max Bartel
Monotypic moth genera